The FIFA Congress is the supreme legislative body of the International Association Football Federation (French: Fédération Internationale de Football Association), commonly known by the acronym FIFA . FIFA is the international governing body of :association football, futsal and beach soccer. The congress may be ordinary or extraordinary.

An ordinary congress meets every year, an extraordinary congress may be convened by the FIFA Council (formerly Executive Committee) at any time with the support of one fifth of the members of FIFA.

Each of the 211 members of FIFA has one vote in the congress. The members of FIFA can propose candidates for the World Cup Host and Presidency of FIFA. The FIFA Presidential Election and FIFA World Cup Host country election takes place at the congress in the year following the FIFA World Cup.

History
The FIFA Congress has been held annually since 1998. It was previously held every two years. Congresses were not held between 1915 and 1922 and 1939 to 1945, due to the First and Second World Wars. FIFA Presidential Elections have taken place at the 1st, 3rd, 12th, 29th, 30th, 39th, 51st, 53rd, 61st, 65th, 69th and 73rd congresses.

The 1961 FIFA Extraordinary Congress in London elected Stanley Rous as President. The 2016 FIFA Extraordinary Congress in Zürich elected Gianni Infantino as the new president on 26 February 2016. Only five elections have had two or more candidates: the 39th (1974), 51st (1998), 53rd (2002), 65th (2015), and 2016 Extraordinary Congress.

List of congresses

Extraordinary congresses
A total of eight extraordinary congresses have taken place: 1908 (Brussels), 1953 (Paris), 1961 (London), 1999 (Los Angeles), 2001 (Buenos Aires), 2002 (Seoul), 2003 (Doha), and 2016 (Zürich). In the 2016 Extraordinary Congress, FIFA President Sepp Blatter would have remained in his position until his successor is elected. However, due to the fact he was suspended, the Acting FIFA President, Issa Hayatou was in charge of FIFA.

See also
List of presidents of FIFA
List of IOC meetings
UEFA Congress

Notes

References

External links
FIFA Congress
Congress venues 1904–2011

 
FIFA
Sports conferences